Khayu is mentioned in the Palermo Stone as a Predynastic Egyptian king who ruled in Lower Egypt. As there is no other evidence of such a ruler, he may be a mythical king preserved through oral tradition, or may even be completely fictitious.

References

Pharaohs only mentioned in the Palermo Stone
People whose existence is disputed